Dyschirius sculptus is a species of ground beetle in the subfamily Scaritinae. It was described by Bousquet in 1988.

References

sculptus
Beetles described in 1988